Fort Macquarie was a square castellated battlement fort built in 1798 at Bennelong Point, Sydney, New South Wales, Australia, on the site where the Sydney Opera House now stands. It was demolished in 1901 to make way for the Fort Macquarie Tram Depot.

History

The original name of Bennelong Point, the finger of land on which Fort Macquarie was built, was Inbughalee (djubuguli), Farm Cove was Yoolaugh and Sydney Cove was Warane.  On 25 November 1789 an Aboriginal man named Bennelong was captured and brought to Governor Arthur Phillip. Eventually three huts were built on this spit of land for Bennelong, his wife Bangaroo, and other Indigenous visitors.

The first attempt at fortifications were erected here in July 1788, when Lieutenant William Dawes was directed to build a small redoubt there. When finished in November 1788 it held two brass six-pounder guns. This early fort was demolished in 1791 and the guns and flagstaff moved to the west side of the cove. The earthworks were then used for the Governor's garden and later the largest building in Sydney, a 24 x 7.5 metre storeroom, was erected there.

In 1798 a half-moon battery was built on the extreme end of the point with which used guns from the "Supply'. It was described by Mr. Pern in 1802, the goal battery on the northern point of Sydney Cove is built on a rock of difficult access, carrying six pieces of cannon protected by a trench of turf, crosses the fire by another battery.

In 1817 Governor Lachlan Macquarie directed that a new fort be built on the site at Bennelong Point and this was completed in February 1821. 

In 1901 the New South Wales Minister of Works decided to remove Fort Macquarie. A naval drill shed on the site was also pulled down and both buildings were replaced with the Fort Macquarie Tram Depot whose crenulated walls imitated the original towers and walls of the fort.

Design
Designed by Francis Greenway the foundation stone of Fort Macquarie was laid by Governor Lachlan Macquarie on 17 December 1817. The stone used was from the nearby Governor's Domain quarry and convicts worked on it for around two years before it was complete. Its square design meant three of its faces were open to the sea to ensure a clear line of fire for its cannons.

At the centre stood a two-storey tower, 27.4 metres in circumference which housed a guardroom and storehouse. The walls at the top were around one and a half metres thick. A powder magazine capable of storing 350 barrels of gunpowder was constructed underneath and the tower could provide accommodation for a small military detachment of 1 officer and 18 men, with stores for the battery. The battery consisted of fifteen pieces of ordnance: ten 24-pounders and five 6-pounders.  

The powder magazine capable of storing 350 barrels of gunpowder was constructed underneath the tower which also provided accommodation for a small military detachment of one officer and 18 men, with stores for the battery. In the early years the fort was separated from the main spit of land by a narrow passage of salt water crossed by a drawbridge, this was later filled up to make a roadway.

Cannon disposal

Two 42 pdr ML cannon from Fort Macquarie were removed from the fort and transported to Newcastle in 1903 to form a memorial in Gregson Park, Hamilton. In 2006 they underwent a refurbishment and have been replaced back into Gregson Park. Another cannon now sits in Hyde Park.

References

History of Sydney
Macquarie
1817 establishments in Australia
Military installations established in 1817
Demolished buildings and structures in Sydney
Buildings and structures demolished in 1901